Alexander Michael Dolgun (29 September 1926 – 28 August 1986) was an American survivor of the Soviet Gulag who wrote about his experiences in 1975 after being allowed to leave the Soviet Union.

Pre-Gulag years
Alexander Dolgun was born on 29 September 1926 in the Bronx, New York, to Michael Dolgun, an immigrant from Poland, and his wife, Annie. In 1933, Michael travelled to the Soviet Union as a short-term technician at Moscow Automotive Works.  After a year in Moscow, Michael consented to another one-year tour on the condition that the Soviet Union pay for his family to come over.  However, when Michael's second tour of duty was up, he was prevented from leaving by bureaucratic barriers erected by the Soviet authorities and his family was trapped. Alexander Dolgun and his older sister, Stella, grew up in Moscow during the Great Purge of the late 1930s and the Second World War. In 1943, the 16-year-old Alexander took a job at the United States Embassy in Moscow.

Gulag
In December 1948, Dolgun, a US citizen, was working as a file clerk at the Embassy. During his lunch break, he was suddenly taken into custody by the Soviet State Security, the MGB.  He was interned in the infamous Lubyanka and Lefortovo prisons in Moscow.  He was falsely accused of espionage against the Soviet Union and endured a year of sleep and food deprivation, as well as brutal psychological and physical torture designed to prod him into "confessing" to his interrogator, Colonel Sidorov. After successfully enduring this trial, Dolgun was transferred to Sukhanovka, a former monastery converted into a prison.

He survived several months of intense torture and was one of a very few who survived the prison with their sanity intact, using tactics such as measuring various distances in his cell as well as distances he covered walking; he estimated that in his time there, the distance he covered walking was enough to take him from Moscow across Europe and halfway across the Atlantic Ocean. His time in Sukhanovka brought him to the brink of death, and he was transferred to the hospital at Butyrki prison to recuperate. His whereabouts were known by Truman, Eisenhower and the US government, but they did nothing for fear of Soviet authorities further harming Dolgun due to fragile US-Soviet relations.

Dolgun was finally given a 25-year sentence in the Gulag, the network of prisoner work camps scattered throughout the Soviet Union.  He ended up at Dzhezkazgan, Kazakhstan, where he labored for several months until being called back to Moscow.  His recall was initiated by the infamous Colonel Mikhail Ryumin, No. 2 to Viktor Abakumov in the Soviet Union's State Security Department and engineer of the Doctors' Plot.  Ryumin intended to use Dolgun as a puppet in a show trial. Dolgun was once again sent to Sukhanovka, where Ryumin personally tortured and beat him in an effort to get him to confess to a number of plots and conspiracies against the Soviet Union.  For several months, Dolgun endured this torture without fully succumbing but eventually signed several nonsensical confessions   Interest in him declined and he was eventually shipped back to Dzhezkazgan, where he was interned until 1956.  Conditions at Dzhezkazgan gradually improved after Stalin's death in March 1953.  Dolgun did not serve at Kengir, but at a camp nearby.  He did, however, mention the Kengir Uprising in his autobiography.

After prison
After his release from prison in 1956, Dolgun returned to Moscow.  Under his release conditions he was not allowed to contact American authorities.  Dolgun discovered that both his mother and father had been tortured in an effort to pressure them to implicate him, driving his mother to insanity.  He took a job translating medical journals into English for the Soviet Health Bureau and befriended several notable Gulag survivors, including Georg Tenno and Aleksandr Solzhenitsyn. Solzhenitsyn included some of Dolgun's experiences in his work The Gulag Archipelago.

Dolgun married Irene in 1965 and they had a son, Andrew, in 1966. His mother died in 1967, and his father in 1968. In 1971, through the efforts of his sister, Stella Krymm, who escaped from the Soviet Union in 1946, and Ambassador John P. Humes, Dolgun managed to get an exit visa and relocated to Rockville, Maryland.  Dolgun took a job at the Soviet-American Medicine section of the Fogerty International Center at the National Institutes of Health.  In 1975, he published the bestseller Alexander Dolgun's Story: An American in the Gulag, co-written with Patrick Watson, which recounted his Gulag experience in detail.

Health and death
Dolgun's health was severely harmed by his experience and he suffered from numerous ailments.  In 1972, he received back pay of $22,000 from the U.S. Embassy for the period of service from 1949 to 1956 and complained that he was paid "peanuts" for his time and should have, at the least, received interest on his salary.

Dolgun died on 28 August 1986, aged 59, in Potomac, Maryland, of kidney failure.  He was survived by his wife and son.

See also 
 The Forsaken: An American Tragedy in Stalin's Russia
 John H. Noble
 Thomas Sgovio
 Victor Herman

References

Footnotes

Bibliography 
 Dolgun, Alexander, and Watson, Patrick, "Alexander Dolgun's Story: An American in the Gulag."
 "American Tells of his Arrest and 8 years as a Soviet Captive." The New York Times. 28 December 1973.
 "Alexander Dolgun; American was held 8 years in the Gulag." The New York Times. 29 August 1986.

20th-century American memoirists
1926 births
1986 deaths
American emigrants to the Soviet Union
American people imprisoned in the Soviet Union
American people of Polish descent
Deaths from kidney failure
Foreign Gulag detainees